Avonmouth railway station is on the Severn Beach Line, serving the Avonmouth district of Bristol.

Avonmouth railway station may also refer to:
Avonmouth railway station (Bristol Port Railway and Pier), the terminus of the Bristol Port Railway and Pier, in use from 1865 to 1903
Avonmouth Dock railway station, the original name for the current Avonmouth railway station
Avonmouth Docks railway station, a short-lived station in use from 1910 to 1915
Avonmouth (Royal Edward) railway station, a station used to connect with cruise ships from 1910 to 1941
St Andrews Road railway station, a station on the Severn Beach Line between Avonmouth and Severn Beach stations, within the district of Avonmouth